The Maine Black Bears men's ice hockey is a (NCAA) Division I college ice hockey program that represents the University of Maine. The Black Bears are a member of Hockey East. They play at the Harold Alfond Sports Arena commonly known as Alfond Arena in Orono, Maine.

The Black Bears have appeared in 11 Frozen Fours, have a 28–18 record in NCAA Tournament games, and have won two national championships—in 1993 and 1999.

Program history

Birth of Maine ice hockey (1977–84)
The University of Maine, then known as the University of Maine at Orono, officially developed an NCAA sanctioned men's ice hockey program in 1977. Creation of this program occurred simultaneously with the construction of the Harold Alfond Sports Arena (Alfond Arena), the facility that is still used for home games today.

This was not, however, the first attempt at birthing a permanent hockey program in Orono. Maine played two seasons of recognized college hockey in 1922 and 1923 totaling 17 games, and primarily playing other Maine colleges such as Bowdoin, Colby and Bates. This program did not stick, and it would be over 5 decades before organized hockey would become a staple at the state's flagship university.

Upon foundation in 1977, the program was coached by Jack Semler (University of Vermont '68). Maine enjoyed modest success under Semler boasting winning records in 3 of their first 4 regular seasons. The Black Bears competed in The Eastern College Athletic Conference (ECAC) during their first 7 years of existence, all of which were under Semler. The ECAC was recognized as Division-II hockey until 1979 at which point the conference, and thus Maine, became Division-I – the level of competition they have competed in ever since.

Shawn Walsh era (1984–2001)
Following the 1983–84 season, head coach Jack Semler submitted his resignation.  With Maine set to join the newly formed Hockey East Association, Maine hired Shawn Walsh, a 29-year-old assistant at Michigan State University and ex-3rd string goalie at Bowling Green State University. Walsh served as assistant coach for Ron Mason at his alma mater and Michigan State where he and Mason turned the Spartans' program from being sub-.500 performers to national contenders in only half a decade.

He inherited a struggling team, so win/loss improvement was not immediate; Maine posted a 23–57–2 record over Walsh's first two years with the program. However, Walsh was attracting top recruits, and convincing the school, the state, and its fans that UMaine had the potential to become a college hockey powerhouse.

In 1986 Walsh and the program saw the first of many significant accomplishments. At 24–16–2, he posted his first winning season as a head coach. The team also made its first NCAA tournament appearance that season, coincidentally losing in the first round to Michigan State.

After finishing as the conference runner up in '87 and '88, Maine brought home its first significant championship in the 1988–89 season. Walsh's Black Bears skated past Boston College in a 5–4 win for their first of 5 HEA Championships. Four of these would come under Walsh. Due to the success and popularity of the program, Alfond Arena expanded its capacity from 3,800 to more than 5,000 in 1992.

1993 National Championship
Maine was a heavy favorite to win its first national championship during the '91–'92 season. Unfortunately, those hopes were dashed when they suffered a surprise first-round loss to Michigan State. After losing three of the team's top four scorers, including Hobey Baker Award winner Scott Pellerin, and many other impact players following the season, expectations for the team dropped entering '92–'93.

However, college hockey would soon learn that the Black Bears had an exceptionally gifted freshman class on their hands in 1992. This included future NHL Star Paul Kariya, and highly touted identical twin forwards Peter and Chris Ferraro. This caliber of talent joining Maine's all-time leading scorer Jim Montgomery, "Little" Cal Ingraham, defensive stalwart Chris Imes, and arguably one of the best goaltending tandems in college hockey history in Garth Snow and Mike Dunham, Maine was set up to make a historic run.

Kariya scored a single season school record 100 points, while Montgomery put an exclamation point on the end of his successful college years finishing with a school record 301 career points. All this was en route to an amazing 42–1–2 season record, an HEA regular season title, the HEA conference championship, and their first-ever national championship.

Their destiny was almost blown during the Frozen Four semifinals against the University of Michigan when the referees disallowed an otherwise legitimate Maine goal. The backside of the net raised when the puck slid in causing confusion as to whether or not it really went in. As a result, the game was tied at the end of regulation when Maine felt they should have won. In overtime, Lee Saunders scored the game winner and sent Maine to the title game against defending champ Lake Superior State University.

Maine's near-perfect season found itself in jeopardy once again in championship game. Despite an early and promising 2–0 lead, the Bears found themselves trailing the seasoned Lakers 4–2 after two periods. Working double shifts for period number three, two likely heroes emerged. Jim Montgomery scored a natural hat-trick in the third period, lifting Maine to a 5–4 win. All three goals were assisted by Kariya.

There was a crackdown on many big college hockey programs during the 1990s for playing athletes who were deemed ineligible. Maine was one of these teams, and they suffered consequences including forfeited losses both retroactively and in future seasons. Some questioned the legitimacy of the 1993 title, but the NCAA let it stand because the players in question were from previous seasons and did not participate in Maine's championship.

1999 National Championship
The middle years of the 1990s were bittersweet for the Black Bears. They enjoyed some on-ice success and finished the national runner up in 1995, but due to sanctions and penalties for reasons previously mentioned, they were unable to compete in the NCAA tournament in 1996 and '97.

The 1998–1999 season crowned a much-less-likely champion than that of 1993. Maine did not win the regular season crown, nor did they even land in their own conference tournament final. They advanced to the NCAAs on an at-large bid due to a successful regular season, but were not most analysts' favorite to win the national title.

Following wins over Ohio State and Clarkson University, Maine advanced to the 1999 Frozen Four in Anaheim, California, where they would meet some familiar foes. Not long after Maine and Boston College met in the Hockey East semifinals, they squared off again in the national semis, with Maine goalie Alfie Michaud besting Scott Clemmensen and lifting the Black Bears past the Eagles 2–1 in overtime.

Though Maine's traditional nemesis for years was Boston University (not only through meaningful games, but because of a well-documented rivalry between Shawn Walsh and BU Head Coach Jack Parker), an even bigger feud was emerging between Maine and the neighboring New Hampshire Wildcats.

Led by Hobey Baker Award winner Jason Krog and future NHL goaltender Ty Conklin, #1 ranked UNH was primed to win their program's first national championship. Goals by Ben Guite and Niko Dimitrakos (Maine), and more outstanding goaltending by eventual tournament MVP Alfie Michaud kept Maine competitive and the scoreboard read 2–2 at the end of regulation.

Shortly after the 10-minute mark in OT, a careless play by UNH in their defensive zone turned into Maine's opportunity as Cory Larose swiped a drifting puck off the nearside boards and made a cross-ice pass to Marcus Gustafsson. Conklin made the initial save but with no defensive help, Gustafsson collected his own rebound and scored the game winner to clinch Maine's second National Championship.

The Death of Walsh
Coach William "Shawn" Walsh inherited a relatively new and obscure hockey program at The University of Maine in 1984 and he was convinced that it could be built up to greatness. His finger was clearly on the pulse of every aspect of the program, and he held a sincere understanding of what it would take to develop success.

It would take a diligent combination of recruiting the right players, a proper coaching staff to develop talent, the support of the university and the Athletic Department, and highly engaged fan bases both on and off campus to create a top college-hockey program.

He took personal ownership in each of these categories. During its grassroots, there are even great stories passed on of Walsh marching into the student dining commons, standing up and shouting on the tables, rallying students down to the games, and encouraging them to create a loud and hostile environment for Maine's opponents. The light blue "Maine-iak" shirts worn by the students at UMaine were one of his many ideas.

Most supporters and enthusiasts of the program credit the foundation of greatness held by the Black Bear Men's Ice Hockey team almost exclusively to Shawn Walsh.

In June 2000 Walsh was diagnosed with renal cell carcinoma (cancer of the kidneys). Knowing that his time may be limited, he hand-selected the coach he wanted to take over the team were he unable to continue. Always known as a fiery coach, Walsh surprised some when he selected mild-mannered UMass Lowell River Hawks coach Tim Whitehead (Hamilton '85). Whitehead earned his graduate degree in education at the University of Maine approximately 10 years prior, and during this time he worked with Walsh as a graduate assistant coach.

Shawn Walsh died from cancer on September 24, 2001.

A green clover with his name underneath is hung in his honor along with the three retired players' numbers in Alfond Arena. In 2006 the Shawn Walsh Hockey Center, a new extension of Alfond Arena with coaching and administrative offices, meeting areas, and new player facilities opened. This several-million-dollar project was funded through private donations—many coming from dozens of players Walsh coached through his 17 years with Maine.

Tim Whitehead era (2001–2013)
Tim Whitehead became the interim head coach following the death of Shawn Walsh at the start of the 2001–2002 season. He was later named the permanent head coach after a very successful first campaign in a year where he was eventually honored with the Spencer Penrose award which recognizes the NCAA coach of the year. Walsh won the Penrose award in 1995.

The team reached the championship game in 2002, the first season under Whitehead. Attempting to "win it for Shawn," they had to play The University of Minnesota Golden Gophers in the Gophers' home state for the finals. They were one minute away from a win when Minnesota tied the game with their goalie pulled. In overtime, after a tripping penalty on Michael Schutte of Maine, the Gophers scored the winning goal on the power play.

Two years later, backed by the most statistically strong single-season goalie tandem in the NCAA record books (Jimmy Howard 1.19GAA .953 Save pct *both NCAA records; Frank Doyle 1.81GAA), future NHL player Dustin Penner, a slew of popular forwards including Todd Jackson, Colin Shields, Maine's own Greg Moore and Derek Damon, conference rookie of the year Michel Leveille, and tough-guy defenseman Prestin Ryan, Maine found itself back in the big game.

The Bears controlled the tempo and jumped on the board early against University of Denver on a Derek Damon goal, but the referees disallowed the goal explaining that part of the skate of Mike Hamilton crossed a line on the goalie crease as the goal went in. Though Howard only allowed one goal, Maine's offense could not find its rhythm after the disallowed goal and they lost 1–0.

That offseason, the NCAA reviewed the rule it followed to call off Maine's goal. They decided to adjust the rule to emulate the NHL's policy on this type of play, that is, only making a "man-in-the-crease" call if the player whose skate crosses the crease actually affects the outcome of the play or the goalie's ability to make the save.

Maine Recession

In the summer of 2008, Assistant Coach Guy Perron and Volunteer Assistant Coach Grant Standbrook both stepped aside from the program.  Standbrook retired, while Perron was hired as an amateur scout for the Colorado Avalanche of the National Hockey League. In 2006 and 2007 Maine would go to the Frozen Four but hit a regrouping session in 2008. 2008 was a dark year as Maine finished 9th in Hockey East and didn't even qualify for the playoffs, then in 2009 Maine entered the Hockey East Playoffs 8th and was eliminated in the first round by BU.

In 2010 Maine reversed their two-year drought and finished 4th in Hockey East, Maine would go all the way to the Hockey East Championship but would lose to BC. The next year a resurgent Merrimack team finished 4th and eliminated Maine from the Hockey East Tournament and once again dashed their hopes of getting back to the national tournament. Going into the 2012 Maine didn't look very likely to break the 4-year drought, especially with the early departure of junior standout Gustav Nyquist, but Spencer Abbott would step up and have an incredible campaign. Abbott would lead the nation in scoring, and lead Maine to 4th in Hockey East, Maine would go all the way to the Hockey East championship, but would once again be beat by future national champion Boston College.

Even though Maine lost in the Hockey East championship they had a good enough record to qualify for the national tournament breaking a four-year drought. The terrific 2012 season ended in the first round of the national tournament with a loss to defending national champion University of Minnesota Duluth. Whitehead was fired on Tuesday April 9, 2013 after going 11–19–8.

Red Gendron era (2013–2021)
On May 17, 2013, University of Maine Paul W. Ferguson and Director of Athletics Steve Abbott introduced Red Gendron as the fifth men's hockey head coach in the history of the University of Maine.   Gendron's first major step towards rebuilding Maine hockey came on June 10, 2013 when he named former Maine Black Bear and NHL player Ben Guité as his first assistant coach.  On June 25, 2013, Gendron announced, longtime NHL coach and scout Jay Leach as associate head coach. Like Gendron, Leach previously served as an assistant coach for UMaine hockey under Shawn Walsh.

The program has continued to struggle under Red Gendron; the Black Bears have posted just two winning seasons since 2012, and in 2014–15, they finished dead last in the Hockey East standings, with an abysmal 8-24-6 overall record, their worst season since 1982. In April 2017, Jay Leach announced his retirement from the program. Coach Guite replaced him as Associate Head Coach. That July, the program hired former Maine goaltender Alfie Michaud as assistant coach. In the 2017–18 season, the team began to make progress, posting an 18-16-4 record, including a nine-game unbeaten streak. The team's overall record fell back slightly to 15-17-4 in the 2018–19 season, but their Hockey East conference record climbed to 11-9-4, good for sixth place out of eleven teams. The following season saw the most successful campaign of Gendron's tenure. The team was picked to finish 8th in Hockey East play, and the season opener resulted in a 7–0 loss at Providence, the worst season-opening loss in program history. However, despite the poor start, the team exceeded its meager expectations; backed by goaltender Jeremy Swayman, the Black Bears managed to finished the regular season with an 18-11-5 record (12-9-3 HEA), finishing 4th in the league and earning home ice in the Hockey East quarterfinals for the first time since 2012. However, on March 12, 2020, the NCAA hockey season was cancelled due to the COVID-19 pandemic. Gendron was named Hockey East Coach of the Year; Swayman was named Hockey East Player of the Year and the Mike Richter Award as the nation's top goaltender, becoming the first Black Bear to earn the award.

Shortly after the end of Maine's abbreviated 2020–21 season, Gendron died following a medical episode while on a golf course.

Season-by-season results

Source:

Coaches

All-time coaching records
As of the completion of 2021–22 season

† Greg Cronin served as the interim head coach for the 1 year that Shawn Walsh was suspended.

Championships

National Championships

Runners-up in 1995, 2002, 2004

Hockey East Tournament Championships

Runners-up in 1987, 1988, 1990, 1991, 1996, 1998, 2002, 2010, 2012

Rivalries

Border War/ New Hampshire Wildcats
The Border War refers to the rivalry between the UNH Wildcats and the Maine Black Bears. College Hockey News has ranked it as the seventh best Division I college hockey rivalry. The Rivalry is extremely intense because of the proximity of the states and the overall success of the two programs. The two programs have also met many times in meaningful post-season games. In 1999 Maine defeated UNH 3–2 in overtime to claim their second national championship, this essentially started the chant "We have 2, How about you!" chanted by Maine fans. Then again in 2002 Maine beat UNH in the national semifinals for a chance at the national championship. Maine and UNH has also met in the Hockey East playoffs many times, fueling the rivalry even more. In 2012 Maine once again defeated UNH in a large scale game at Fenway Park, winning 5–4 in overtime.

Boston College Eagles
The rivalry between Maine and BC is not one of as much publicity as that of Maine/UNH or BC/BU, but is still intense. Maine and BC have met in 7 Hockey East Championship games with Maine winning 2 of those championships, The teams have also met in 4 Hockey East semifinals, with Maine winning 1 semifinal against BC. This rivalry is another rivalry where the success of both teams has contributed to the intensity of the games between the two teams. Maine and BC have also met in 2 national semifinals, Maine won both meetings, but never in a national championship game. Maine and BC have 7 combined National championships.

Boston University Terriers
The rivalry between Maine and BU is one much like Maine/BC. They've only met in 2 Hockey East Championship, games each team winning one. In 1993 Maine lost only one game all year to BU, this loss came after taking a large lead and blowing it. Maine and BU also met in the 1995 National Championship game, BU won the game 6–2. Maine and BU have met 6 times in the Hockey East semifinals, Maine has won all 6 semifinals. The intensity of the games, combined with the mutual dislike of the fans results in very heated games every time they meet.

Florida College Classic
The Florida College Classic is an annual single elimination tournament played in Estero, Florida at Germain Arena. The Tournament is co-hosted by Maine and Cornell each year, also 2 other teams will play to form a semifinal format. Since Shawn Walsh was so instrumental to the inception of the tournament the Most Outstanding Player receives the Shawn Walsh Memorial Trophy. Maine has won 6 Florida College Classics and has been to 8 title games in the tournaments first 13 years.

Current roster
As of January 9, 2023.

Awards and honors

Hockey Hall of Fame

Paul Kariya (2017)

NCAA

Individual awards

Hobey Baker Award
Scott Pellerin: 1992
Paul Kariya: 1993

Spencer Penrose Award
Shawn Walsh: 1995
Tim Whitehead: 2002

Mike Richter Award
Jeremy Swayman: 2020

Derek Hines Unsung Hero Award
Brice O'Connor: 2014

NCAA Scoring Champion
Paul Kariya: 1993
Gustav Nyquist: 2010
Spencer Abbott: 2012

Tournament Most Outstanding Player
Jim Montgomery: 1993
Alfie Michaud: 1999

All-American Teams
AHCA First Team All-Americans

1979–80: Andre Aubut, D
1980–81: Gary Conn, F
1987–88: Jack Capuano, D; Dave Capuano, F
1988–89: Dave Capuano, F
1990–91: Keith Carney, D; Jean-Yves Roy, F
1991–92: Scott Pellerin, F; Jean-Yves Roy, F
1992–93: Mike Dunham, G; Chris Imes, D; Paul Kariya, F
1994–95: Blair Allison, G; Chris Imes, D
1995–96: Jeff Tory, D
1998–99: David Cullen, D; Steve Kariya, F
2005–06: Greg Moore, F
2006–07: Michel Léveillé, F
2009–10: Gustav Nyquist, F
2011–12: Spencer Abbott, F
2019–20: Jeremy Swayman, G

AHCA Second Team All-Americans

1986–87: Eric Weinrich, D
1987–88: Mike Golden, F; Mike McHugh, F
1988–89: Bob Beers, F
1989–90: Keith Carney, D; Jean-Yves Roy, F
1990–91: Jim Montgomery, F
1992–93: Cal Ingraham, F; Jim Montgomery, F
1994–95: Jeff Tory, D
1999-00: Cory Larose, F
2001–02: Peter Metcalf, D; Niko Dimitrakos, F
2003–04: Jimmy Howard, G; Prestin Ryan, D; Todd Jackson, F; Colin Shields, F
2005–06: Michel Léveillé, F
2010–11: Gustav Nyquist, F
2013–14: Ben Hutton, D; Devin Shore, F

ECAC Hockey

All-Conference Teams
First Team All-ECAC Hockey

1979–80: Andre Aubut, D
1980–81: Gary Conn, F

Second Team All-ECAC Hockey

1980–81: Jeff Nord, G; Andre Aubut, D

Hockey East

Individual awards

Player of the Year
Mike McHugh, LW: 1988
Scott Pellerin, LW: 1992
Paul Kariya, LW: 1993
Chris Imes, D: 1995
Spencer Abbott, RW: 2012
Jeremy Swayman, G: 2020

Rookie of the Year
Al Loring, G: 1986
Mario Thyer, C: 1988
Scott Pellerin, LW: 1989
Paul Kariya, LW: 1993
Jimmy Howard, G: 2003
Michel Léveillé, C: 2004
Teddy Purcell, RW: 2007

Goaltending Champion
Scott King: 1987, 1988, 1990
Garth Snow: 1993
Blair Allison: 1995
Jimmy Howard: 2004
Jeremy Swayman: 2020

Best Defensive Forward
Todd Jackson, LW: 2004
Tanner House, C: 2011
Chase Pearson, F: 2019

Len Ceglarski Award
Steve Kariya, LW: 1997, 1998, 1999
Cory Larose, C: 2000
Martin Kariya, LW: 2003
Mike Lundin, D: 2007
Brian Flynn, RW: 2011

Best Defensive Defenseman
Cliff Loya: 2003
Prestin Ryan: 2004

Coach of the Year
Shawn Walsh: 1988, 1990, 1993, 1995
Red Gendron: 2020

Tournament Most Valuable Player
Bob Beers, D: 1989
Scott Pellerin, LW: 1992
Jim Montgomery, C: 1993
Niko Dimitrakos, RW: 2000
Jimmy Howard, G: 2004

Three-Stars Award
Martin Ouellette: 2013

All-Conference Teams
First Team

1986–87: Eric Weinrich, D
1987–88: Scott King, G; Jack Capuano, D; Mike McHugh, F; Dave Capuano, F
1988–89: Dave Capuano, F
1989–90: Scott King, G
1990–91: Keith Carney, D; Jean-Yves Roy, F
1991–92: Scott Pellerin, F
1992–93: Mike Dunham, G; Chris Imes, D; Paul Kariya, F; Jim Montgomery, F
1994–95: Blair Allison, G; Chris Imes, D; Jeff Tory, D
1995–96: Blair Allison, G; Jeff Tory, D; Tim Lovell, F
1996–97: Jason Mansoff, D; Tim Lovell, F
1998–99: David Cullen, D; Steve Kariya, F
1999–00: Cory Larose, F
2001–02: Mike Morrison, G; Peter Metcalf, D
2002–03: Francis Nault, D; Martin Kariya, F
2003–04: Jimmy Howard, G
2005–06: Greg Moore, F
2006–07: Michel Léveillé, F
2009–10: Gustav Nyquist, F
2010–11: Gustav Nyquist, F
2011–12: Spencer Abbott, F; Brian Flynn, F
2013–14: Ben Hutton, D; Devin Shore, F
2019–20: Jeremy Swayman, G 

Second Team

1986–87: Jack Capuano, D
1987–88: Mike Golden, F
1988–89: Scott King, G; Bob Beers, D
1989–90: Keith Carney, D
1990–91: Shaun Kane, D; Jim Montgomery, F
1991–92: Garth Snow, G; Chris Imes, D; Jim Montgomery, F; Jean-Yves Roy, F
1992–93: Garth Snow, G
2001–02: Niko Dimitrakos, F
2002–03: Lucas Lawson, F
2003–04: Prestin Ryan, D; Todd Jackson, F; Colin Shields, F
2005–06: Michel Léveillé, F
2006–07: Mike Lundin, D; Josh Soares, F
2007–08: Ben Bishop, G
2009–10: Jeff Dimmen, D
2010–11: Josh Van Dyk, D
2011–12: Joey Diamond, F
2014–15: Devin Shore, F
2018–19: Chase Pearson, F
2019–20: Mitchell Fossier, F
2022-23: Victor Ostman, G; Lynden Breen, F

Third Team

2018–19: Jeremy Swayman, G; Brady Keeper, D; Mitchell Fossier, F

Rookie Team

1986–87: Dave Capuano, D
1987–88: Mario Thyer, F
1988–89: Keith Carney, D; Scott Pellerin, F
1989–90: Jim Montgomery, F; Jean-Yves Roy, F
1990–91: Patrice Tardif, F
1992–93: David MacIsaac, D; Chris Ferraro, F; Paul Kariya, F
1994–95: Jeff Tory, D; Shawn Wansborough, F
1995–96: Brett Clark, D; Steve Kariya, F
1996–97: Cory Larose, F
1997–98: Matthias Trattnig, F
1998–99: Peter Metcalf, D; Barrett Heisten, F
2001–02: Colin Shields, F
2002–03: Jimmy Howard, G
2003–04: Michel Léveillé, F
2004–05: Bret Tyler, D
2005–06: Ben Bishop, G
2006–07: Teddy Purcell, F
2008–09: Gustav Nyquist, F
2010–11: Dan Sullivan, G
2017–18: Jeremy Swayman, G
2021–22: David Breazeale, D

Statistical leaders
Source:

Career points leaders

Career goaltending leaders

GP = Games played; Min = Minutes played; W = Wins; L = Losses; T = Ties; GA = Goals against; SO = Shutouts; SV% = Save percentage; GAA = Goals against average

minimum 30 games played

Statistics current through the start of the 2018–19 season.

Records

NCAA

Individual
Most Power Play Goals in a Game: Jay Mazur, 4 (Feb 17, 1987 vs UMass Lowell)
Best Save Percentage in a Season: Jimmy Howard, .956 (2003–04)

Team
Most Wins in a Season: 42 (1992–93)
Most Goals in a Season: 292 (1992–93)
Most Goals in a Period: 11 (Nov 11, 1978 vs St Thomas)
Most Power Play Goals in a Game: 8 (March 3, 1990 vs UMass Lowell)

Hockey East

Individual
Most Goals In A Game: Brian Flynn and Jay Mazur, 5
Most Power Play Goals In A Game: Jay Mazur, 4 (Feb 7, 1987 vs UMass Lowell)
Most Points In A Game By A Defenseman: Jack Capuano, 6 (Jan 30, 1988 vs New Hampshire)
Most Points In A Season By A Rookie: Paul Kariya, 63 (1992–93)
Most Assists In A Season By A Rookie: Paul Kariya, 48 (1992–93)
Most Assists In A Game By A Rookie: Paul Kariya, 5 (Dec 5, 1992 vs Northeastern)
Longest Point Streak: Paul Kariya, 23 games (1992–93)

Team
Best Win Percentage In A Season: .938 (1992–93)
Fewest Losses In A Season: 1 (1992–93)
Most Road Wins In A Season: 12 (1992–93)
Longest Winning Streak: 16 (Nov 7, 1992 - Feb 13, 1993)
Longest Unbeaten Streak: 30 (Jan 25, 1992 - Feb 13, 1993)
Fewest Goals Allowed In A Season: 42 (2003–04)
Most Power Play Goals In A Season: 50 (1990–91)
Most Short-Handed Goals In A Game: 3 (Jan 23, 2004 vs Boston University)

Program Records

Single Season
Most Goals: Cal Ingraham; 46 (1992–93)
Most Assists: Paul Kariya; 75 (1992–93)
Most Points: Paul Kariya; 100 (1992–93)
Most Points By A Defenseman: Keith Carney; 56 (1990–91)
Most Points By A Rookie: Paul Kariya; 100 (1992–93)
Most Wins: Blair Allison; 32 (1994–95)
Most Wins By A Rookie: Ben Bishop; 21 (2005–06)
Lowest Goals Against Average: Jimmy Howard; 1.19 (2003–04)
Best Save Percentage: Jimmy Howard; .956 (2003–04)
Most Saves: Jeremy Swayman; 1,099 (2019–20)
Most Shutouts: Jimmy Howard; 6 (2003–04, 2004–05)

Career
Most Goals: Jean-Yves Roy, 108
Most Assists: Jim Montgomery, 198
Most Points: Jim Montgomery, 301
Most Points By A Defenseman: Keith Carney, 128
Most Wins: Garth Snow, 64
Best Goals Against Average: Jimmy Howard, 1.84
Best Save Percentage: Jimmy Howard, .931
Most Shutouts: Jimmy Howard, 15

Olympians
This is a list of Maine alumni were a part of an Olympic team.

Maine Sports Hall of Fame
The following is a list of people associated with the Maine men's ice hockey program who were elected into the Maine Sports Hall of Fame (induction date in parenthesis).

Andre Aubut (1988)
Dave Capuano (2008)
Jack Capuano (2013)
Keith Carney (2009)
Gary Conn (1989)
Mike Dunham (2010)
Jimmy Howard (2011)
Chris Imes (2003)
Ray Jacques (2018)
Paul Kariya (1999)
Steve Kariya (2012)
Scott King (2005)
Mike McHugh (2006)
1993 Team (2017)
Jim Montgomery (1998)
Scott Pellerin (1997)
Jean-Yves Roy (2004)
Garth Snow (2007)
Grant Standbrook (2017)
Shawn Walsh (2002)
Eric Weinrich (1994)

Black Bears in the NHL
As of July 1, 2022.

Team Scoring Champions

The (+) denotes a tie in total points at the end of the season.

References

http://www.hockeyeastonline.com/pdf/men/tourney/tournamentquick.pdf
http://www.hockeydb.com/ihdb/stats/alumni.php?tmi=8628
 Florida College Hockey Classic
http://insidecollegehockey.com/6History/hobey_finalists.htm
http://www.uscho.com/stats/team/maine/mens-hockey/2012-2013/#overallstats
http://www.uscho.com/team/maine/mens-hockey/
http://www.uscho.com/2013/04/09/report-whitehead-ousted-as-maines-head-coach/
http://www.uscho.com/scoreboard/maine/mens-hockey/2013-2014/
http://www.uscho.com/scoreboard/maine/mens-hockey/2014-2015/

External links

Records

 
Ice hockey teams in Maine